The Edmonton City Council is the governing body of the City of Edmonton, Alberta, Canada.

Edmonton currently has one mayor and twelve city councillors. Elections are held every four years. The most recent was held in 2021, and the next is in 2025. The mayor is elected across the whole city, through the First Past the Post plurality voting system. Councillors are elected one per ward, a division of the city, through the First Past the Post plurality voting system.

On July 22, 2009, City Council voted to change the electoral system of six wards to a system of 12 wards; each represented by a single councillor. The changes took effect in the 2010 election. In the 2010 election, Edmonton was divided into 12 wards each electing one councillor. Before that system was adopted in 1980, the city at different times used a variety of different electoral systems for the election of its councillors: two different systems of wards, one using FPTP, the other Block Voting systems; at-large elections with Block Voting; and at-large elections using Single Transferable Voting (when Alternative Voting was used to elect mayors).

In May 2019, Edmonton's Ward Boundary Commission began reviewing the city's current geographical boundaries. The final report was delivered on May 25, 2020. On December 7, 2020, Bylaw 19366 was passed which included the new geographical boundaries and new Indigenous ward names. The Indigenous ward names were determined by the Committee of Indigenous Matriarchs  and came into effect on October 18, 2021, the date of the 2021 municipal election. The Committee of Indigenous Matriarchs, also referred to as the naming committee, was composed of 17 women representing communities from treaty territories 6, 7 and 8, along with Métis and Inuit representation.

Councils

Since 2021
In 2021, the twelve ward boundaries were modified and given indigenous names in place of numbers.

From 2010 until 2021
In 2010, Edmonton adopted a ward system in which one councillor was elected from each of twelve wards.
The mayor was elected from the city at-large.

In 2010, council was elected to serve three years. In 2013 and 2017 they were elected to serve for four years.

From 1980 until 2010
In 1980, Edmonton adopted a ward system in which two councillors (aldermen until 1995) were elected from each of six wards. These wards were more organic than the previous four-ward system.

The mayor was elected at-large. Those elected served for three years.

From 1971 until 1980
In 1971, Edmonton adopted a ward system in which three aldermen would be elected from each of four wards. Each ward was a north–south slice of the city so each contained territories on both sides of the river.

Still the mayor and the councillors were to serve for three years.

1968
The 1968 Edmonton city election was different from the one before and the one after. Like the 1966 election the mayor and all the city councillors were up for election, councillors elected at large through Block Voting. But unlike 1968 they were to serve for three years.

In 1968 Alberta's legislation had been changed to require elections every three years in all of the province's municipalities.

From 1964 until 1966
In 1964 two new aldermanic positions were added, bringing the total to twelve. As well Edmonton unstaggered its terms for city officials, meaning that all the council seats would be up for election each election, held  every two years.  In preparation for this, in 1964 the mayor and all aldermanic positions up for re-election were elected to one-year terms. All alderman continued to be elected at-large through block voting.

From 1948 until 1963
In 1948, the mayor began to be elected for a two-year term, with annual elections still used to elect half the council each year through Block Voting.  The council continued to be elected at-large to staggered two-year terms until 1963, when the council seats up for election were filled just for one year (to prepare for the change in 1964 to all seats being up for election each election.

From 1912 to 1960, seats were guaranteed to southsiders. The guaranteed representation for the southside was cancelled after a 1960 referendum. (But in 1971 with the introduction of wards altogether south of the river, southside representation was re-established.)

From 1928 until 1947
In this period, following a referendum in 1927, the city returned to using block voting to elect councillors at-large (in one city-wide district). Aldermen continued to be elected on staggered two-year terms, but the mayor was elected for a one-year term.

There was still guaranteed minimum representation for the south side of the North Saskatchewan River.  This number increased over time. It was two until 1936, and three thereafter.

From 1923 until 1927
In this period, following a successful referendum in 1922, the city used Single Transferable Voting, a form of proportional representation, to elect councillors. The effect was that no one party took all the seats up for election.  Alternative Voting was used to elect mayors to ensure that the successful candidate had to have a majority of the votes to win (but no transfer took place if only two candidates ran for the post or if one candidate took a majority on the first count).

The southside still had guaranteed representation, of at least two councillors.
The mayor continued to be elected annually, and aldermen continued to be elected to staggered two-year terms.

From 1912 until 1922
As part of the amalgamation agreement with City of Strathcona south of the river, in 1912 council expanded to ten members and adopted guaranteed representation, of at least two seats, for the south side. (Wards were not established, but at least two southsiders had to be elected.) The mayor continued to be elected annually, and aldermen continued to be elected to staggered two-year terms.

From 1904 until 1911
Edmonton was incorporated as a city in 1904.  The size of council was set at eight alderman plus the mayor, with the mayor being elected annually and the aldermen being elected on staggered two-year terms.

Edmonton Town Council

From 1898 until 1904
The Edmonton Town Council was the governing body of Edmonton, Northwest Territories, from 1892 until 1904, when Edmonton was incorporated as a city and the council became Edmonton City Council. Throughout its history it included a mayor and six aldermen.

The mayor was elected annually throughout the town's history, but beginning in 1898 they were elected to staggered two-year terms, with half of them elected each year.

From 1892 until 1898
The mayor and aldermen were elected annually from 1892 to 1898.

Notes

External links
City of Edmonton Official site
City of Edmonton Ward Maps

Municipal government of Edmonton
History of Edmonton
Municipal councils in Alberta